Golestan (also Romanized as Golestān and Gulistan) is a village in Rezaqoli-ye Qeshlaq Rural District of the Central District of Nir County, Ardabil province, Iran. At the 2006 census, its population was 390 in 96 households. The following census in 2011 counted 416 people in 120 households. The latest census in 2016 showed a population of 417 people in 126 households; it was the largest village in its rural district.

References 

Nir County

Towns and villages in Nir County

Populated places in Ardabil Province

Populated places in Nir County